William Geise was a member of the Wisconsin State Assembly in 1879. Other positions he held include member of the town board of supervisors of Portland, Dodge County, Wisconsin. He was a Democrat. Geise was born on January 26, 1820.

References

People from Portland, Dodge County, Wisconsin
Wisconsin city council members
Democratic Party members of the Wisconsin State Assembly
1820 births
Year of death missing